Wang Kuong Leong (born 18 March 1990) is a male Macau sprinter. He competed in the 100 metres event at the 2015 World Championships in Athletics in Beijing, China.

See also
 Macau at the 2015 World Championships in Athletics

References

1990 births
Living people
Place of birth missing (living people)
Macau male sprinters
World Athletics Championships athletes for Macau
Athletes (track and field) at the 2014 Asian Games
Asian Games competitors for Macau